Clypeaster annandalei is a species of sea urchins of the Family Clypeasteridae. Their armour is covered with spines. Clypeaster annandalei was first scientifically described in 1922 by Koehler.

See also 

 Clypeaster aloysioi
 Clypeaster amplificatus
 Clypeaster australasiae

References 

Animals described in 1922
Clypeaster